Arvind Kumar Singhal is a columnist for Business Standard (a financial news daily in India) who regularly wrote the column, Marketmind appearing on alternate Thursdays. The column has been in circulation for 7 years and focuses on the pulse of the market in India.

Mr. Singhal  is also the Managing Director of Technopak, a management consulting firm based out of Gurgaon.

Education
Mr. Singhal has done his bachelor's from University of Roorkee (Now IIT Roorkee)  and his master's from UCLA, after which he worked DCM Group, VXL India and Modern suitings before founding Technopak in 1991.

References 

Indian financial writers
Living people
Year of birth missing (living people)